The 1973 Men's World Weightlifting Championships were held in Havana, Cuba from September 15 to September 23, 1973. There were 189 men from 39 nations in the competition. These were the first championships held since the elimination of the clean and press from competition.

Medal summary

Medal table

Ranking by Big (Total result) medals 

Ranking by all medals: Big (Total result) and Small (Snatch and Clean & Jerk)

References
Results (Sport 123)
Weightlifting World Championships Seniors Statistics

External links
International Weightlifting Federation

World Weightlifting Championships
World Weightlifting Championships
World Weightlifting Championships
Sport in Havana
International sports competitions hosted by Cuba
Weightlifting in Cuba